The 4th Infantry Division "Livorno" was a infantry division of the Royal Italian Army during World War II. The Livorno was classified as a mountain infantry division, which meant that the division's artillery was moved by pack mules instead of the horse-drawn carriages of line infantry divisions. Italy's real mountain warfare divisions were the six alpine divisions manned by Alpini mountain troops. The Livorno was formed on 5 April 1939 in Cuneo and named for the city of Livorno.

History 
The division's lineage begins with the Brigade "Livorno" established by order of the Provisional Government of the Grand Duchy of Tuscany on 4 November 1859 with the 5th and 6th infantry regiments. On 25 March 1860 the Brigade "Livorno" entered the Royal Sardinian Army three days after the Kingdom of Sardinia had annexed the United Provinces of Central Italy, which included the Grand Duchy of Tuscany. Already before entering the Royal Sardinian Army the brigade's two infantry regiments had been renumbered on 30 December 1859 as 33rd Infantry Regiment and 34th Infantry Regiment.

World War I 
The brigade fought on the Italian front in World War I. On 1 October 1926 the brigade assumed the name of IV Infantry Brigade and received the 38th Infantry Regiment "Ravenna" from the disbanded Brigade "Ravenna". The brigade was the infantry component of the 4th Territorial Division of Cuneo, which also included the 28th Artillery Regiment.

In 1930 the division exchanged the 38th Infantry Regiment "Ravenna" for the 44th Infantry Regiment "Forlì" with the 3rd Territorial Division of Alessandria. In 1934 the division changed its name to 4th Infantry Division "Monviso". During the Second Italo-Ethiopian War the division's 34th Infantry Regiment "Livorno" was sent to garrison Leros in the Italian Islands of the Aegean. The regiment departed on 3 September 1935 and returned on 14 September 1936. 

On 31 March 1939 the division ceded the 44th Infantry Regiment "Forlì" to the newly activated 36th Infantry Division "Forlì" and on 5 April of the same year the IV Infantry Brigade was dissolved and the two remaining infantry regiments came under direct command of the division, which changed its name to 4th Infantry Division "Livorno".

World War II 
At the beginning of June 1940, the Livorno division was deployed for the Italian invasion of France at the border with France, south-west of Vinadio, concentrating at Pas de Saint-Anne and Lausfer pass. Rear echelons stretched back to Bagni di Vinadio. The division started operations on 13 June 1940 by shelling across the border. The actual advance started 15 June 1940 with the capture of Collalunga pass at altitude 2608 m. There was intermittent fighting mostly in the form of artillery barrages until 23 June 1940, when fierce fighting erupted. After a day-long assault, the Italian forces were able to break the French defenses and reached Saint-Honorat in La Bollène-Vésubie commune. Afterward, the advance stalled and not much progress was made until the armistice of 25 June 1940.

In April 1942 the Livorno began to reorganize as an auto-transportable division of the North-African type for the planned invasion of Malta scheduled for summer of that year. However due to the deteriorating situation in the North African theater the division was reformed as a motorized unit and earmarked for the Tunisian campaign. Once the transfer to Tunisia got underway the division was rerouted to Sicily as the situation in Tunisia worsened. In Sicily the division initially deployed in the area of Caltanissetta, San Cataldo, Aragona, Raffadali, and Serradifalco as the 6th Army's mobile reserve.

Sicily 
The Livorno was the only Italian mobile division in Sicily as it had sufficient transport to move all of its infantry units simultaneously. Located in southern Sicily at the start of the Allied landings on 10 July 1943, the division carried out a substantial counterattack 10–11 July 1943 and threatened to throw the invaders back into the sea, being stopped just a few hundred meters from the beaches. On 10 July Livorno's infantry supported by the 155th Bersaglieri Motorcyclists Company and a column of tanks poured onto Highways 115 and 117 and nearly retook the city of Gela, but guns from the destroyer Shubrick and the light cruiser Boise destroyed several Fiat 3000 tanks. Also, Allied forces had attacked the division's right flank from Licata towards the direction of Ravanusa and Riesi, tying up many of the Italian troops. The Battle of Gela was reported by an American newspaper: "Supported by no less than forty-five tanks, a considerable force of infantry of the Livorno Division attacked the American troops around Gela. The American division beat them back with severe casualties. This was the heaviest response to the Allied advance." The Livorno regrouped and made a further attempt to retake Gela two days later and the III Battalion, 34th Infantry Regiment "Livorno", is recorded by its commanding officer to have made a valiant effort in the Gela Beachhead, but on 15 July 1943, the Allied armored units that attacked from west between Valguarnera Caropepe and Raddusa threatened to encircle the Livorno. Raddusa was lost by the Italians on 18 July 1943 after heavy fighting, and the Livorno took a stand at the Simeto river south of Catania. On 22 July 1943 the Livorno division was subject to heavy coastal bombardment by British ships between Leonforte and the mouth of the Simeto, but managed to hold its position.

Failures of other Axis units in Sicily then forced the Livorno to retreat. The retreat route passed through Agira and Regalbuto, where the division suffered severe losses. The remnants of Livorno were sent to Castroreale to reorganize on 30 July 1943, but because of a complete absence of supplies, the decision was made to evacuate the remnants of the division to the mainland Italy. On 1 August 1943, the Livorno division reached Messina. From 1-14 August 1943 the Livorno was ferried to Calabria, suffering further losses in the process. Only 4,200 troops out of an initial strength of 13,000 could be saved. In early September 1943, the Livorno returned to Piedmont to be reformed. After the announcement of the Armistice of Cassibile on 8 September 1943 the division was disbanded by the invading German forces on 9 September 1943, while all of its personnel was on leave.

Organization 

The 4th Infantry Division "Livorno" had its recruiting area in southern Piedmont and was headquartered in Cuneo. Its two infantry regiments were based in Cuneo (33rd) and Fossano (34th), with the division's artillery regiment also based in Cuneo.

  4th Infantry Division "Livorno", in Cuneo
 33rd Infantry Regiment "Livorno", in Cuneo
 Command Company
 3x Fusilier battalions
 Support Weapons Company (65/17 infantry support guns)
 Mortar Company (81mm Mod. 35 mortars)
 34th Infantry Regiment "Livorno", in Fossano
 Command Company
 3x Fusilier battalions
 Support Weapons Company (65/17 infantry support guns)
 Mortar Company (81mm Mod. 35 mortars)
 28th Artillery Regiment "Livorno", in Fossano
 Command Unit
 I Motorized Group (100/17 howitzers)
 II Motorized Group (100/17 howitzers)
 III Motorized Group (75/18 Mod. 35 howitzers)
 IV Motorized Group (75/18 Mod. 35 howitzers)
 3x Anti-aircraft batteries (20/65 Mod. 35 anti-aircraft guns)
 Ammunition and Supply Unit
 IV Self-propelled Anti-tank Battalion (47/32 L40 self-propelled guns; joined the division in 1942)
 IV Mortar Battalion (81mm Mod. 35 mortars)
 LVII Mixed Engineer Battalion (formed in 1942)
 4th Anti-tank Company (47/32 anti-tank guns)
 18th Anti-tank Company/ 18th Infantry Division "Messina" (47/32 anti-tank guns; attached July 1941)
 4th Telegraph and Radio Operators Company (entered the LVII Mixed Engineer Battalion in 1942)
 20th Engineer Company (entered the LVII Mixed Engineer Battalion in 1942)
 12th Medical Section (replaced in 1942 by the 68th Medical Section)
 4x Field hospitals
 13th Surgical Unit
 68th Medical Section
 20th Field Hospital
 22nd Field Hospital
 63rd Field Hospital
 122nd Field Hospital
 1x Surgical Unit
 129th Transport Section
 4th Truck Section (disbanded in 1942)
 8th Supply Section
 56th Bakers Section 
 10th Carabinieri Section 
 11th Carabinieri Section
 77th Field Post Office

Attached during the invasion of France in 1940:
 XCV CC.NN. Battalion

Attached from 10 February to 18 August 1941:
 195th CC.NN. Legion "Giovanni delle Bande Nere"
 Command Company
 LXXI CC.NN. Battalion
 LXXXI CC.NN. Battalion
 195th CC.NN. Machine Gun Company

Commanding officers 
The division's commanding officers were:

 Generale di Divisione Antero Canale (1936 - 14 December 1939)
 Generale di Divisione Benvenuto Gioda (15 December 1939 - 31 May 1943) 
 Generale di Divisione Domenico Chirieleison (1 June 1943 - August 1943)
 Generale di Brigata Vincenzo Robertiello (August 1943 - 9 September 1943)

References

External links
 In 1947, Lt. Col. Dante Ugo Leonardi, formerly commander of the 3rd Battalion, 34th Infantry Regiment of the Livorno Division, published a little book entitled Luglio 1943 in Sicilia (July 1943 in Sicily). The account can be read here.

Infantry divisions of Italy in World War II
Military units and formations established in 1939
Military units and formations disestablished in 1943
1939 establishments in Italy
1943 disestablishments in Italy